Pantothenate kinase 4 is an enzyme (pantothenate kinase) that in humans is encoded by the PANK4 gene.

This gene encodes a protein belonging to the pantothenate kinase family. Pantothenate kinase is a key regulatory enzyme in the biosynthesis of coenzyme A (CoA) in bacteria and mammalian cells. It catalyzes the first committed step in the universal biosynthetic pathway leading to CoA and is itself subject to regulation through feedback inhibition by CoA. This family member is most abundant in muscle but is expressed in all tissues.

See also
 Pantothenate

References

Further reading